Depot Hill railway station (Sindhi: ڊيپو هل ريلوي اسٽيشن) is located in Pakistan, about four kilometres away from Karachi Jinnah International Airport. Although Depot Hill is located just off Pakistan Railway Main Line-1, it is a commuter station and thus no express trains serve it.

See also
 List of railway stations in Pakistan
 Pakistan Railways

References

External links

Railway stations in Karachi
Railway stations on Karachi Circular Railway